Lambrey is a commune in the Haute-Saône department in the region of Bourgogne-Franche-Comté in eastern France. Its geographical coordinates are 47° 46' 0" North, 5° 56' 0".

See also
Communes of the Haute-Saône department

References

Communes of Haute-Saône